The Harvard Glacier is a large tidewater glacier in the Alaska's Prince William Sound. The glacier has a 1.5-mile (2 km) wide face where it calves into the College Fjord. It is 300 ft thick and covers 120,000 acres of Chugach National Forest. The Harvard Glacier is the second largest glacier in the Prince William Sound, after the Columbia Glacier. It is a popular destination of cruise ships in the Prince William Sound.

See also
 List of glaciers

References

Glaciers of Alaska
Glaciers of Chugach Census Area, Alaska
Glaciers of Copper River Census Area, Alaska
Glaciers of Matanuska-Susitna Borough, Alaska
Glaciers of Unorganized Borough, Alaska